Changlong station or Changlong railway station may refer to:
 Hanxi Changlong station, a metro station on Guangzhou Metro Line 3 and Line 7.
 Guangzhou Changlong railway station, on Foshan–Dongguan intercity railway.
 Changlong station (Shenzhen Metro), a metro station on Shenzhen Metro Line 5.
 Zhuhai Changlong railway station